Tollerodden, spelt Tolderodden until 1917, is a peninsula located in the bottom of the Larvik fjord and a part of Larvik town located on the southeast coast of Norway.

The Larvik fjord is open in the southeast, so Tollerodden was the safest place in Larvik harbour, and thus the town started at Tollerodden and the nearby surroundings. As Larvik grew, the commercial harbour was moved further out the fjord, and Tollerodden is preserved near to as it was in the town's early years.

Tollerodden has become world known by the naval architect Colin Archer who was born here and had his boatyard here. He became world famous for his seaworthy pilot and rescue boats and the polar ship FRAM.

The name and early history 

Tollerodden means «The Customs peninsula» as a Customs house was situated here. The name was spelt Tolderodden (with «ld») until 1917 when Norway had its second modernization of the languish replacing Danish words and spelling closer to Norwegian dialects. «Tolder/toller» means the Customs officer and «odden» means peninsula.

By coincidence, Tollerodden was owned by Niels Toller in 1667-69 and it has been speculated that the name had been spelt with «ll» in early days, but there is no evidence of that, and it is more likely that the Customs house gave name to the peninsula.

The Customs house 
In the 1660s the Customs revenue grew significantly as Larvik town was expanding and the Customs officer was a wealthy man. The Customs account 1670-71 shows that a building was built, and it became so expensive that it was sold to the officer for a reduced price. It is not documented that this building was at Tollerodden, but timber from today's building, has been dated to have been cut 1667–1668. The location is very central in the harbour, so it was a sensible place to have The Customs office. From 1686 to 1789, four known Customs officers lived there and the house served as the Customs office.

In 1794, the building and large property owned by the Customs, was bought by a wealthy ship owner and merchant Hans Falkenberg. The house was extensively rebuilt and extended. The roof was angled more by lowering the edge so only ground floor had windows on the sides. At the east end an extension was added as a T-building. This is basically as the building is today. In 1820 it was sold to three ship owners.

Larvik church 

Larvik church is located at Tollerodden next to the Customs property. The church was given permission to build in 1668 and was finished in 1677, the tower been added in 1762.

Laurvig Hospital 

In 1736 Laurvig Hospital, a wooden building, was built next to the church. In 1760 it was replaced with a brick building which is today in its original shape. In the early 18-hundreds, it served as a school and today it is run by a foundation as social lodgings. «Laurvig» is the old way of spelling Larvik and spelling kept for this building.

Larvik Maritime museum 

The building was built in 1714 as a brick building by a merchant. In 1728 it was severely damaged by fire and extensive repair and changes was done. The house had different uses during the years, but is still in the 1730 rebuild shape. In 1850 the house became the Customs Office. Later, the building was used as a theatre, mineral water factory, knitwear factory and warehouse. In 1962 it became the maritime museum. The Maritime Museum is today it is a part of the Larvik Museum and is only open in the summer time. The Maritime museum has some of Archers drawings, but most of them are at the museum in Oslo. Larvik does not have a permanent Archer exhibition, but there are plans for a new building for a Colin Archer-center to house both the rescue boat STAVANGER and the pilot boat STRAAHOLMEN.

The breakwater harbour Skotta 
In 1750 a wooden pier was built inside Tollerodden. This was destroyed many times by storms, so it was early decided to make a solid breakwater of stones. This was first started in 1770 but stopped many times and was not finished until 1805. The breakwater was again damaged several times and several extensive repairs was done. In 1835 it had the shape it has today. Now the harbour give wooden boats priority.

Shipyard at Tollerodden until 1813 
There were a small shipyard on town side of Tollerodden, just west of where Colin Archer later had his yard. The ship ovner Falkenberg, owner of Tollerodden (previously Customs house) from 1794, ran the shipyard and the last ship built, was the three masted bark PRIMA, built to himself in 1813.

The Scottish Archer family to Tollerodden 

William Archer was a timber and lobster merchant in Scotland. He traded with Norway and in 1819 he visited Norway and Larvik and lived there for long periods as agent for the Scotland business. The business did not go too well, so he decided to emigrate to Larvik and rather be an exporter there. He bought a sailing ship POMONA and with his wife and their eight children, sailed to Larvik in 1824 and founded an export company for timber and lobster. In 1826 they bought the Customs/shipowner house which property still included the whole west part of Tollerodden with shoreline from the town side and all around to the southeast.

The Archer brothers to Australia 
William Archer's wife, with maiden surname Walker, had an uncle in Australia and when business did not go too well in Norway too, their sons were sent to the uncle in New South Wales, a bit inland from Sydney, where they started sheep farming. Eight of the Archer brothers emigrated, the first in 1834.

Tolderodden Conservation Park, Eidsvold, Queensland, Australia 
The older Archer brothers, although born in Scotland and some teenagers when emigrated, loved Tollerodden, Larvik and Norway. They therefore named several places they acquired of new land in Australia with Norwegian names. After some years near Sidney, the brothers started exploiting areas further north to find better farming land. One place they stopped at was 700 kilometers further north, and northwest of Brisbane. They called the place Eidsvold (spelt the old way with «ld») named after the town where the Norwegian Constitution was formed and signed in 1814. Their settlement is now known as Eidsvold Homestead. They also named an area Tolderodden, now known as Tolderodden Conservation Park.

Colin Archer joined his brothers 
Colin was born at Tollerodden in 1832 as the twelfth child. He loved sailing as most youngsters brought up in fjords and the skerries. After school he was apprentice at a shipyard for 18 months.

In 1851 Colin's father found a ship bound for America and sent him off to join his elder brothers in Australia. After meeting a brother in California and one in Hawaii, he ended up in Australia after two years travel and adventure.

Gracemere Homestead in Rockhampton 
When Colin arrived, they had decided to move to the new place and Colin thus became part owner of the new farm. The new place was located near to what is now known as Rockhampton and they called their farm Gracemere after one of the brothers' wife. The buildings still exist and is now known as Gracemere Homestead.

Colin Archer back home; naval architect and yard owner 

When the parents were getting old, the brothers in Australia, decided to return home in 18 months shifts to look after them and a sister was also still living at home. Colin was no. 2 and arrived home in 1861. He was then well off with income from his part ownership in the farm and had also invested in other companies.

When Colin arrived Tollerodden, the parents' house, where also two of Colin's sisters still lived, desperately needed repair. Colin estimated this to cost 2-3.000 dollars and the brothers agreed to split the costs between them.

Colin took up sailing and started building small boats in his spare time. Boatbuilding interested him so much that he started to study all available literature on Naval Architecture. Being well off, he could afford expensive books like Chapman's and Scott Russel's books. After meeting a woman that interested him, he decided to stay and build boats. They married and in 1869 and had a new house built, just 25 meters from the parents' house. The house also served as his office and design office.

At first, the larger boats were built outdoor, but in 1872 he had a shed set up at the town side of Tollerodden. After he had built his first small boats, he employed boatbuilders work and became a professional naval architect. He titled himself as yard owner. Some years later he had another shed set up.

Having the good income from abroad, this allowed him to build boats without a customer and he introduced the latest international knowledge to his designs. The Norwegian pilot boats at the time, was of the old type «cods head-mackerel» type, lightly ballasted and not very seaworthy; hardly any pilot was buried ashore. Colin might have thought it would be an easy match to get into the pilot boat marked, but conservatism in the workboats industry was hard to persuade. So, already in 1873, he decided to go for larger ships and bought a part in a yard further out in the Larvik fjord at Rekkevik, called «Laurvig Strandværft».

However, he kept getting orders on pilot boats, so the boatbuilding at Tollerodden was continued as well.

In 1877 he published his «Wave-form Theory» for boat and ship design in The Field and had it read for the English Institution of Naval Architects. His theory was a variation of John Scott Russell's world famous «Wave-line Theory». By questioning this with what many regarded more logic and adopted, Colin Archer became world famous long before he had taken the most important steps in improving the Norwegian pilot boats.

He gradually became famous for his fast and seaworthy pilot boats with ballast keels and especially for his rescue boats, a larger and heavy weather version of the pilot boats. In 1892 he built the polar ship FRAM that became world famous for its voyages close to both north and south pole.

Colin ran his business until 1909, aged 77. His young foreman would have continued the business in another location if he had not died suddenly that same year. The Tollerodden yard was thereafter used for laying up boats for winter and for boat maintenance.

Street names at Tollerodden 
The street that goes in a half circle past the Customs house, was called Tolbodgaten (Customs street) but was later changed to today's name Kirkestredet (Church path). The street leading up to the church from the town side, was called Kirkegaten (Church street) but was renamed to Colin Archers gate (street), in 1917, three years before he died.

Tollerodden bought by Larvik town 

In 1939, the Archer family sold to Larvik municipality. The yard was still used for laying up boats, but the boatsheds and sailmaker's house were pulled down on after one, the latest in the 1970s and the area made into a park area. However, the yards launching slopes were kept and is still there. Tollerodden became a popular public area, especially the pond on the south side suited for kids to learn to swim.

Customs/Archer house 
The Larvik municipality used Customs/Archer house for many different purposes, kindergarten, schools, etc. It ended up as social lodgings with poor maintenance and vandalism and in the early 1990s the municipality wanted to demolish the house. Enthusiast argued against the demolition and in 1992 a foundation was formed and was given the building. The building is now immaculately restored, and this work revealed hidden building details from the 1790s, totally unknown at the time.

Tollerodden today 

Tollerodden has not changed much since the Archer time. The Archer property also have a large garden and park still with the pond, all restored to the Archer time, and popular area for the Larvik citizens all year.

Reference list

Further reading 

 Colin Archer
 Larvik
 Serle, Percival (1949). "Archer, Thomas". Dictionary of Australian Biography. Sydney: Angus and Robertson.

Sources 

 Johnsen, Oscar Albert (1923). Larviks historie 1 - 1814. Grøndahl & Søn, Kristiania, Norway. Web link
 Langeland, A. St. (1953). Larviks historie, 2 - 1814–1885. Larvik kommune, Norway. Web link.
 Langeland, A. St. (1963). Larviks historie, 3 - 1885–1940. Larvik kommune, Norway. Web link.
Aagaard, Aage (1900) Larvik og omegns industri og næringsliv i tekst og bilder. A.M. Hanches forlag. Christiania (Oslo), Norway. Web link.
 McDonald, Lorna (1997) Magic ships: life story of Colin Archer, 1832–1921, and Sailing for pleasure (Central Queensland University Press) 
 McDonald, Lorna (1991) Over Earth and Ocean. The Archers of Tolderodden and Gracemere. (Central Queensland University Press. 
 McDonald, Lorna (1981) Sketches of Old Rockhampton. Sketches by Edith Neish. (University og Queensland Press, St Lucia, Queensland) 
 Svendsen, Terje. Tollerodden - fra privat prakt til folkets oase. Own publication of the Tollerodden Foundation November 2020. Spiral booklet 113 pages.
 Jeppe Jul Nielsen & James Ronald Archer. Colin Archer. Den verdenskjente båtkonstruktøren på Tollerodden. Own publication of the Tollerodden Foundation November 2019. Spiral booklet 75 pages.
 Leather, John (1979) Colin Archer and the Seaworthy Double-Ender (International Marine Publishing Company) 
 Sannes, Tor Borch (1984) (Reprint 1978+1979). Batbyggeren Colin Archer. (Norsk Maritimt Forlag: Oslo, Norway). pp. 304–417.

External links 

 Friends of Tollerodden - Tollerodden.no (in English)
 Colin Archers History (by Jeppe Jul Nielsen)
 RS 1 COLIN ARCHER - website in English (by owners)
 The Fram Museum - in Oslo

Larvik
Peninsulas of Vestfold og Telemark